Sleeping Beauty Castle is a fairy tale castle at the center of Disneyland and formerly at Hong Kong Disneyland. It is based on the late 19th century Neuschwanstein Castle in Bavaria, Germany. It appeared in the Walt Disney Pictures logos from 1985 to 2006 before being merged with Cinderella Castle, both iconic symbols of The Walt Disney Company. The version at Disneyland is the only Disney castle whose construction was overseen by Walt Disney.

A redesigned and larger version of the castle is used as the icon of Disneyland Paris.

Disneyland

Opened July 17, 1955, the castle is the oldest of all Disney castles. The castle initially featured an empty upper level that was never intended to house an attraction, but Walt Disney was not satisfied with what he viewed as wasted space, and challenged his Imagineers to find some use for the space.

Beginning on April 29, 1957, the visitors were able to walk through the castle and view several dioramas depicting the story of Sleeping Beauty. The voice of Jiminy Cricket from Walt Disney's Pinocchio (1940) singing "When You Wish Upon a Star" is piped into the castle. The original dioramas were designed in the style of Eyvind Earle, production designer for Disney's 1959 film Sleeping Beauty (released nearly four years after the Disneyland Sleeping Beauty Castle was opened), and were then redone in 1977 to resemble the window displays on Main Street, U.S.A. The walkthrough was closed for unspecified reasons on October 7, 2001; popular belief claims the September 11th attacks and the potential danger that ensued played a major factor in the closing. Disney spokesman John McClintock said that the 9–11 attacks rumors weren't true. “I am aware of those rumors,” he said. “But in 2001, it really wasn’t resonating with guests. In the late 90s, early 2000s, arguably the most popular thing about Sleeping Beauty was that you could always get in because nobody went to it.”

On July 17, 2008, Disney announced that the Sleeping Beauty Castle walkthrough would reopen in the style of the original Earle dioramas, enhanced with new technology not available in 1957. The walkthrough reopened on November 27, 2008 at 5:00 p.m., drawing long lines going as far back as the Hub at the center of the park. Unlike previous incarnations, visitors who are unable to climb stairs or navigate the passageways of the Castle can still experience the walkthrough "virtually" in a special room on the Castle's ground floor. This room is lavishly themed, and presents the closed-captioned CGI walkthrough recreation on a high-definition TV. This same virtual recreation is included on the Sleeping Beauty  50th Anniversary Platinum Edition DVD.

The castle walkthrough entrance is on the west side of the building inside Fantasyland. Guests first see a large medieval-themed story book open to a page that announces the birth of the princess Aurora. After climbing the stairs inside, a scene depicts Aurora as a baby, being blessed with magic gifts by her fairy godmothers. Behind a glass window, there is an animation of the castle courtyard, and the king and queen watching as a large fire burns all the spinning wheels in the kingdom. At the top of the stairs, as guests reach the center of the castle's top level, another window looks out on the castle's great hall, where everyone in the kingdom is asleep, including servants and the cat and dog. The second half of the walkthrough becomes darker, featuring appearances by Maleficent, her crow, and several gargoyles which fly out of her nearby castle. At the end, the prince fights against Maleficent's incarnation as a dragon, amid a forest of thorny brambles, and then a field of roses appears with doves flying above, as he kisses Aurora and breaks the spell. As guests exit the walkthrough at the bottom of the stairs on the east side of the castle, another medieval-themed oversized book depicts an image of the prince and princess dancing together, as her dress changes colors from pink to blue and back again.

The Disney family coat of arms hangs above the archway to the castle. It is composed of three lions passant in pale. It is known that the coat of arms was not originally on the castle, but was placed there sometime between June 1965  and July 1965.

At the rear of the castle, shaded by the archways and driven into the ground is a gold spike that is widely, but wrongly, believed to mark the geographical center of Disneyland. In reality, the spike is a surveyor's mark that was used to ensure that the castle bridge and entrance lined up with Main Street USA when the park was first constructed. The original geographical center of the Magic Kingdom was in the middle of the round park, where the "Partners" statue of Walt Disney and Mickey Mouse stands. The addition of Mickey's Toontown in 1993 moved the actual center of the park a few yards northward, but still on the hub side of the castle drawbridge.

In January 2019, renovations on Sleeping Beauty Castle began in Disneyland. The entrance to Fantasyland was blocked through the archway of the castle during this refurbishment.

Fiftieth anniversary
In celebration of Disneyland's 50th anniversary, both Sleeping Beauty and Cinderella Castle received makeovers. In Disneyland, the castle was repainted and five turrets were decorated with stylized crowns, each representing a decade in the park's history:
The creation of Disneyland is represented by a pair of famous "Ears" peeking up over the horizon to see the wonders to come.
"A World on the Move", otherwise known as the "New Tomorrowland" of 1967, is represented by rocket ships and accented by opalescent planets.
The Blue Fairy represents the debut of the Main Street Electrical Parade.
The Indiana Jones Adventure is represented by the evil Eye of Mara, guarded by snakes.
The 50th Anniversary of Disneyland is represented by fireworks and Tinker Bell.
The gold railings were also added into the second floor of the castle for the safety of pyrotechnics workers. They were removed after 10 years and replaced with hidden railings that move up only when needed.

Sixtieth anniversary
For Disneyland's 60th anniversary, World of Color changed to the World of Color: Celebrate! The Wonderful World of Walt Disney. Disneyland introduced Paint The Night and a new fireworks show, "Disneyland Forever". A 24-hour kickoff event occurred May 22, 2015.

As part of the celebration, the castle was covered with diamonds and glitter, with a large 60th logo in the center. Carthay Circle Restaurant at Disney California Adventure was also decorated for the Diamond Celebration. Most of the decoration on the castle was removed shortly after the celebration, although the decorative faux roofs remained until January 2018, as the old roofs get more damaged as the days go on during the celebration and 2017.

100 Years Of Wonder 
For the company's Centennial Jubliee, Disneyland introduced a new fireworks show, "Wondrous Journeys". 

As part of the celebration, the castle was covered with sliver and glitter, with a large 100th logo in the center. Fountains were also installed in the moat in front of the castle.

Disneyland Park (Paris) 

Sleeping Beauty Castle (English for Le Château de la Belle au Bois Dormant) is at the centre of Disneyland Park and a continuation of Sleeping Beauty Castle first seen at Disneyland in California.

The Castle features two parts, a dungeon area in the base featuring an Audio-Animatronic dragon and, above, a concrete balcony walkthrough area with Sleeping Beauty–themed stained glass windows and tapestries. There are also several shops selling glass figures, ornaments and gifts.

"Sleeping Beauty Castle at Disneyland was inspired by the Neuschwanstein Castle in Southern Germany. This European influence was fine for building a castle in Anaheim, but the fact that castles exist just down the road from Disneyland Paris challenged us to think twice about our design." —Tony Baxter, executive designer Walt Disney Imagineering

The castle has received several overlays throughout the years. The first occurred during the park's first anniversary celebration in 1993, when the castle was dressed up as a cake complete with strawberries, icing and candles. This overlay was removed after the celebration ended. The cake overlay concept was later copied by Walt Disney World's Cinderella Castle in 1996 for the 25th Anniversary of the resort.

During the fifth anniversary of Disneyland Paris in 1997, the castle was decorated in carnival masks, jester hats, frills and bells to promote the animated film The Hunchback of Notre Dame. This overlay lasted until the beginning of 1998.

During the tenth anniversary of Disneyland Paris in 2002, the front of the castle was fitted with a golden scroll displaying a large 10. The celebration also saw the opening of Walt Disney Studios next door. The scroll and other anniversary material in the park were removed in 2003.

In 2007, the castle received another overlay, celebrating the park's fifteenth anniversary. It featured golden Disney characters displayed on the turrets and spires, each holding a candle, and Tinkerbell on the highest spire. The candles were illuminated each night during a special 'Candlebration' ceremony which took place on a raised temporary stage at Central Plaza, in front of the Castle. A huge illuminated gold plaque featuring a large '15' was hung on the front of the castle. This echoed the overlay from the tenth anniversary in 2002. The fifteenth anniversary and the 'Candlebration' ceremony ended on March 7, 2009.

The fifteenth anniversary overlay quickly followed on April 4, 2009 by Mickey's Magical Party, a "theme year" celebration held at the park. The castle was again overlaid, this time with a Mickey and Friends plaque over the main window, and the spire heads were changed from being characters to being 3 circles "of ribbon" representing Mickey Mouse. A more permanent Central Plaza stage was built outside the castle to host the "It's dance time... with Mickey and Friends" show.

The castle was repainted in a new colour-scheme, restored and fitted with multicolored LED lighting during 2011. For the Disney Dreams nighttime spectacular show its moat was fitted with water fountains, the upper window was replaced by doors that open to reveal a LED lighted star and Central Plaza stage was removed in order to increase the viewing area.

Hong Kong Disneyland

Hong Kong's Sleeping Beauty Castle was a nearly identical copy of the original in California. However, the two castles were differentiated through very subtle details. Hong Kong Disneyland used a different color scheme compared to that of Disneyland, with more natural white and pink colours for the accents and cornice. It also had fewer trees surrounding its castle, which allowed a more open view to accompany the nightly fireworks show.

The castle closed on January 1, 2018 for a redesign as part of the park's 15th anniversary celebration. This redesign is meant to pay tribute to 14 Disney princesses and heroines. It has been renamed Castle of Magical Dreams.

During the 5th Anniversary
In celebration of Hong Kong Disneyland's fifth anniversary, Celebration in the Air, the castle was transformed into Tinker Bell's Pixie Dusted Castle. The castle was decorated with golden pixie dust, which sparkled and shimmered in the sun and was illuminated by night.

During the 10th Anniversary
Although no significant decorations were added to Hong Kong Disneyland's Sleeping Beauty Castle for the park's 10th anniversary, the nightly "Disney In The Stars" fireworks show was added with elaborate projection mapping with visuals to complement the display. This, however, resulted in the elimination of a few pyrotechnic elements launched from the front of the castle during the show.

Logo usage

As Sleeping Beauty Castle is a Disney icon, it was used in the opening of the Walt Disney anthology television series from the show's beginning in 1954 until the late 70s, when it was replaced by the Cinderella Castle. It was also the logo of Walt Disney Pictures, Walt Disney Television, Disney Music Group and Walt Disney Studios Motion Pictures from 1985–2006. As of Pirates of the Caribbean: Dead Man's Chest in 2006, the logo is now 3D CGI and includes elements of both this castle and Cinderella Castle.

See also

 Le Château de la Belle au Bois Dormant
 Cinderella Castle
 Castle of Magical Dreams
 Enchanted Storybook Castle

References

Amusement rides introduced in 1955
Amusement rides introduced in 2005
Walt Disney Parks and Resorts attractions
Walt Disney Parks and Resorts icons
Disneyland
Sleeping Beauty (1959 film)
Fantasyland
Castles in California
Buildings and structures completed in 1955
Buildings and structures completed in 2005
1955 establishments in California
2005 establishments in Hong Kong
2018 disestablishments in Hong Kong